NASCAR '99 is a racing simulator video game developed and published by EA Sports and co-developed by Stormfront Studios. It was released for Nintendo 64 on September 10, 1998, and for the PlayStation on September 29. NASCAR '99 was the second game in the EA Sports NASCAR series of video games.

Features
NASCAR '99 is the second game relating in EA Sports NASCAR series of video games. The game features thirty-one of the drivers from the 1998 Winston Cup Series season and six legendary drivers. The game also includes seventeen different NASCAR race tracks, including Atlanta Motor Speedway, Sears Point, and Michigan International Speedway. Furthermore, the game includes instructions from a crew chief, such as when to make a pit stop or when cars are around the player.

Development
EA confirmed the game's existence in April 1998.

Reception 

Next Generation reviewed the PlayStation version of the game, rating it four stars out of five, and stated that "in the end, NASCAR 99 isn't going to win any converts from GT, but it is sure to please those looking for a good stock car challenge. While not a huge improvement over NASCAR 98, it is a better game, and makes it a worthy upgrade if only for the Dual Shock support".

NASCAR '99 received mixed reviews upon its release. The game was praised for its authenticity, although critics felt that the graphics and sound effects were not improved from the previous game, NASCAR '98. Also, critics stated that the player would become "tired" of the game if they were a "racing-game fan".

References

1998 video games
EA Sports games
Electronic Arts games
NASCAR video games
Nintendo 64 games
PlayStation (console) games
Simulation video games
Stormfront Studios games
Multiplayer and single-player video games
Video games developed in the United States